Josu Agirre Aseginolaza (born 23 May 1981 in Tolosa) is a Spanish professional road bicycle racer.

Major results
2004
 1st Stage 2 Giro delle Valli Cuneesi nelle Alpi del Mare
2006
 1st Stage 1 Vuelta a la Comunidad de Madrid
2007
5th Overall Vuelta a Navarra

External links 

Cyclists from the Basque Country (autonomous community)
1981 births
Living people
People from Tolosa, Spain
Spanish male cyclists
Sportspeople from Gipuzkoa